Revolutionary Socialism is a Trotskyist political party in Spain affiliated with International Socialist Alternative (ISA). It publishes monthly magazines in Spanish and Catalan called La Brecha and La Bretxa which contained a socialist perspective on news and current issues.
It campaigned for a party of the working class to express the political needs of those not benefiting from the capitalist system. They believed a strong and organized movement of workers and young people can overthrow capitalism and establish a new society. This can be achieved by taking banks and big business into public ownership and administering them through democratic control and management.

Political views

Catalan independence
They were in favour of the right to self-determination including independence but fought for a socialist Catalan state as part of voluntary Iberian federation. They were against alliances with pro capitalist parties for independence as it would suppress the voice of the working class who hold the real power for change through mass movements.

Abortion rights
Revolutionary Socialism said it was in favour of abortion rights and wanted trade union involvement in the fight for free, safe and legal abortions as part of a public health system. To give women a real choice however, investment in services that allow the reconciliation of private and work life as well as free access to contraceptives through a system of public healthcare is needed so that women don't have abortions for financial reasons or because they are not able to combine work and motherhood. This means investment in health, education, the care sector, social welfare and childcare.

Merger with Izquierda Revolucionaria Revolutionary Left (Spain)
After a series of discussions and exchanges of documents a merger was agreed with Izquierda Revolucionaria or Revolutionary Left (Spain) who joined the Committee for a Worker's International along with their co thinkers in Venezuela and Mexico. This was agreed at a conference in Madrid on 13 April 2017 and confirmed at a conference of the CWI in Barcelona on 22 July 2017.  The merged group will use the name Izquierda Revolucionaria.

In 2019, Izquierda Revolucionaria left the CWI. Supporters of the CWI Majority were expelled from IR by the EC in Madrid and reactivated Revolutionary Socialism as a separate organization.

References

Spain
Far-left politics in Spain
Trotskyist organisations in Spain
Communist parties in Spain